The Association of Art and Antique Dealers (also known as LAPADA, for its former name: London and Provincial Antique Dealers Association) is the largest UK trade association of art and antiques dealers.

References

External links
 

1974 establishments in the United Kingdom
Retail trade associations
Organizations established in 1974